Fabian Abramovich Garin (1895–1990) was a Soviet writer and World War II veteran. He had graduated from the Kyiv Polytechnic Institute in 1924, but lived and worked in Moscow. Among his works are documentary and belletristic books Towards the Pole (1937), The Expulsion of Napoleon (1948), Vasily Blücher (1963–67) and The Flowers on Tanks (1963).

Notes

1895 births
1990 deaths
Writers from Kyiv
People from Kievsky Uyezd
Ukrinform people
Soviet writers
Kyiv Polytechnic Institute alumni
Soviet military personnel of World War II